Heri Setiawan Dwi Cahyono (born 15 September 1987) is an Indonesian-born Bahraini male badminton player

Achievements

BWF International Challenge/Series
Men's Singles

Men's Doubles

Mixed Doubles

 BWF International Challenge tournament
 BWF International Series tournament
 BWF Future Series tournament

References

External links
 

1987 births
Living people
Bahraini male badminton players
Indonesian male badminton players
People from Klaten Regency
Sportspeople from Central Java